Nikolai Mitkin (13 March 1929 – 9 February 1998) was a figure of the Communist Party of the Soviet Union.

Biography 
In 1953, Mitkin graduated from the Karelia-Finnish University. In 1954, he joined the Communist Party of the Soviet Union (CPSU). From 1959 to 1961, he worked at the Karelian Regional Committee of CPSU. Later, he was secretary (1961–1963) and 2nd secretary (1963–1965) of the Petrozavodsk city committee of the CPSU. He then worked as a lecturer at the Karelian Regional Committee of CPSU (1968–1969) and instructor of the Central Committee of CPSU (1969–1984). In 1986, he became the Second Secretary of the Communist Party of Lithuania (CPL), joined the Central Committee and the Bureau of CPL. He was also elected to the Supreme Soviet of the Lithuanian SSR.

In the Lithuanian SSR, Mitkin worked to suppress the independence movement. In January–February 1988, he coordinated actions against commemoration of Lithuania's independence day on February 16. He unsuccessfully tried to prevent the establishment of Sąjūdis, openly calling it fascist and demanding that its members be expelled from the communist party. In 1988, due to his staunch belief in Marxism-Leninism and personal ambitions, his resignation was demanded by employees of the Lithuanian Academy of Sciences and participants in Sąjūdis' rallies. On 28 September 1988, on Mitkin's initiative and with the approval of the first secretary of CPL Ringaudas Songaila, special units of the Internal Troops of the Soviet Union were used against the participants of a peaceful rally organized by the Lithuanian Liberty League. In October 1988, Mitkin was dismissed from his duties by a decision of the Central Committee of the CPL. It was the first time that CPL overrode decisions of the Central Committee of CPSU.

References 

1929 births
1998 deaths
Party leaders of the Soviet Union
Members of the Central Committee of the Communist Party of Lithuania